Gauruncus gracilis is a species of moth of the family Tortricidae. It is found in Bolivia and Ecuador (Morona-Santiago Province).

The wingspan is 12.5 mm. The ground colour of the forewings is brownish cream, reticulated (a net-like pattern) and suffused with brown. The hindwings are brown.

Etymology
The species name refers to the slender, hooked bristle of the sacculus and is derived from Latin gracilis (meaning slender, thin).

References

Moths described in 2006
Euliini
Moths of South America
Taxa named by Józef Razowski